Grevillea goodii, also known as Good's grevillea, is a species of flowering plant in the family Proteaceae and is endemic to the Northern Territory. It is a prostrate shrub with egg-shaped to narrowly elliptic leaves and clusters of light green flowers with a pink to red style.

Description
Grevillea goodii is a prostrate shrub with stems trailing from a lignotuber. The edges of the leaves are wavy and the lower surface is pimply and slightly hairy.

Taxonomy
Grevillea goodii was first formally described in 1810 by Robert Brown in the Transactions of the Linnean Society of London. The specific epithet (goodii) honours Brown's assistant, Peter Good.

Distribution and habitat
Good's grevillea occurs in the tropical Top End of the Northern Territory, from Darwin eastwards to Gunbalanya, and southwards almost as far as Pine Creek. It grows on siliceous sandy or loamy soils in low heath, savanna woodland and open eucalypt forest.

References

goodii
Proteales of Australia
Endemic flora of Australia
Flora of the Northern Territory
Plants described in 1810
Taxa named by Robert Brown (botanist, born 1773)